The 2019–20 season is Aquila Basket Trento's 25th in existence and the club's 7th consecutive season in the top flight of Italian basketball.

Overview 
Trento reached the Top16 of the EuroCup Basketball and ended the round with no wins.

The 2019-20 season was hit by the coronavirus pandemic that compelled the federation to suspend and later cancel the competition without assigning the title to anyone. Trento ended the championship in 9th position.

Kit 
Supplier: Spalding / Sponsor: Dolomiti Energia

Players

Current roster

Depth chart

Squad changes

In

|}

Out

|}

Confirmed 

|}

Coach

Competitions

Serie A

EuroCup

Regular season

Top 16

References 

2019–20 in Italian basketball by club
2019–20 EuroCup Basketball by club